William Dennis Scanlan (March 7, 1881 – May 29, 1949) was a pitcher in Major League Baseball. Scanlan pitched from 1903–1911 with the Pittsburgh Pirates and Brooklyn Dodgers.

External links

1881 births
1949 deaths
Baseball players from Syracuse, New York
Major League Baseball pitchers
Pittsburgh Pirates players
Brooklyn Superbas players
Brooklyn Dodgers players
Ilion Typewriters players
Syracuse Orangemen baseball players
Manhattan Jaspers baseball players
Fordham Rams baseball players